Vimba vimba, called also the vimba bream, vimba, zanthe, or zarte, is a European fish species in the family Cyprinidae. It largely lives in the sea but makes an annual migration up-river each year to breed.

Description
The vimba bream was at one time classified as a bream as it also has a long anal fin, but has now been placed in a different genus. Its body is not as deep as that of the bream. It also resembles the asp but its mouth is small and behind the snout whereas the asp has a large mouth with the lower jaw protruding. The scales are small and there are about sixty of them along the lateral line. This fish is a deep bluish-green on the dorsal surface and silvery along the flanks. The eyes are yellow and the pectoral and pelvic fins have reddish-yellow bases. The colouring becomes more vivid in the breeding season and males may have the operculum, base of the fins and the belly turn orange.

Distribution
Vimba vimba is distributed in fresh waters and in brackish estuaries of rivers draining to the Caspian Sea, Black Sea and Baltic Sea, and in the North Sea basin in the Elbe and Ems drainages. There are records from Armenia, Austria, Azerbaijan, Belarus, Bulgaria, Czech Republic, Estonia, Finland, France, Georgia, Germany, Hungary, Iran, Latvia, Lithuania, Moldova, the Netherlands, Poland, Romania, Russia, Serbia and Montenegro, Slovakia, Sweden, Switzerland, Turkey, North Macedonia, and Ukraine.

The vimba bream is a semi-anadromous fish, which migrates from brackish water to rivers for spawning. Permanently fresh-water populations exist as well. In the Baltic Sea the species is distributed up to 62°-63° N in Sweden and Finland.

Behaviour
Vimba breams move in small shoals along the sea coast, feeding on invertebrates which they pick from the seabed, and the eggs of other fish. They leave the sea in May or June, swimming upriver to spawn in fast-moving tributaries with stony or gravelly bases and little vegetation. The males prepares several areas of riverbed on which the females deposit batches of eggs. In Lithuania, there is a festival each year along the shore of the Neman River to celebrate the arrival of the fish.

References

Vimba
Fish described in 1758
Taxa named by Carl Linnaeus
Freshwater fish of Europe
Fish of Europe
Taxonomy articles created by Polbot